Tavinan Kongkran (born June 1, 1964, in Bangkok, Thailand) was Thailand's representative at Miss World 1983 in the United Kingdom.

References 

1964 births
Living people
Miss World 1983 delegates
Tavinan Kongkran
Tavinan Kongkran